This is a list of songs of Jack de Nijs.

Own releases 
Releases as Jack Jersey or Jack de Nijs or Ruby Nash:, and or composed and or written and or arranged and or produced by Jack de Nijs.
 

A Broken Heart With A Smile
Accept My Love
Addio Amore (Jack de Nijs)
After All The Years
After Sweet Memories
A Lot Of Livin' to Do
Al ben ik Mr. Mundy niet (Jack de Nijs)
All I Do Is Dream
Anak ini (Dari Cimahi)
Angelina (Jack de Nijs)
Anita
Answer Me
Asian Dreams
At The End Of It All
Ave Maria (This Xmas Lore)
Ay ay waar blijft Maria (Jack de Nijs Sextet-1972)
Baby, Can't You Feel It (Jack Jersey and The Jordanaires-live recorded)
Be My Little Woman
Bella Lucia (Jack de Nijs Sextet-1972)
Berapa (How Many)
Blame It On The Summersun (Ruby Nash)
Blame It On The Summersun
Blue And Lonely Christmas
Blue Brown-Eyed Lady
Blue Spanish Eyes
Breaking Up
Careless Babe (Jack Dens & The Swallows-1961)
Christina (Jack de Nijs Sextet)
Close To You
Come On
Conny
Daisy Bell (Ruby Nash)
Dark Moon
Devil in disguise
Don't Break This Heart
Don't
Don't be Cruel
Dreamer
Dreams Gonna be Real (Jack Dens & The Swallows-1960)
Du bist 'ne Lady und ich bleib' ein Vagabund
Eiland in de zon
Ein Wunderbares Mädchen
Elisa (Jack de Nijs)
Forever
Geen poen voor Barcelona (Jack de Nijs)
Gelukkig Kerstfeest (War Is Over) (Artists for Ronald McDonaldhuis)
Get Your Fun
Give Me Love
Give Me Time (The Losers-1966)
Gone
Gone Girl
Gone Girl Xmas version
Goodbye My Love (My Nona Manis)
Got A Lot Of Livin' To Do 
Got no home
Good Old Sunshine
Happy X-mas (War Is Over) (Artist for Ronald McDonaldhuis)
Health of Freedom
Heaven in Your Eyes (Jack Dens & The Swallows-1961)
Heaven Is My Woman's Love
Heaven's no more heaven
Heavenly Woman (The Four Sweeters-1960)
Hee dans met mij (Jack de Nijs Sextet)
Hé Hé Rosie (Jack de Nijs)
Helena (Jack de Nijs)
Helena
Hello Darling
Help Me Make It Through The Night
Here Comes Summer
Here i am Acapulco
Het spijt me voor jou (Jack de Nijs)
Higher Than The Mountains
His Latest Flame
Home Little Home (The Four Sweeters-1960)
Honey Babe
Honky Tonk Man (Jack Jersey and The Jordanaires-live recorded)
How Many
Hurry Home
I Can Stand Tomorrow
I Can't Help Thinking
I Can't Wait For Tomorrow
I Wonder (Jack Jersey And The Jordanaires-live recorded)
I Won't Cry
If You Leave Me
Ik kan 't niet laten (Jack de Nijs)
I'll Be Home On Christmas Eve
I'll Be Lonely (The Four Sweeters-1960)
I'll Hold Your Hand
I'll Hold Your Hand (Jack Jersey And The Jordanaires-live recorded)
I'll Miss You (Jack Jersey and The Jordanaires- live recorded)
I'll Miss You
I'm Calling
Ingatan Indah Waktu Natal (Merry Christmas, Sweet Memory)
In Old Mexico
In The Arms Of Her New Friend
In The Still Of The Night
In The Still Of The Night (Jack Jersey and The Jordanaires-live recorded)
Ist die Liebe vorbei?
It's A Beautiful Day
I was a fool
Juanita
Just One Time
Keep It In The Middle
Keep On Rollin'
Keep On Shakin'
Kesepian (Gone Girl)
Lady
Lean On Me
Let It Be Me
Let's Come Together Now
Lieve Heer, Heb Medelij (Jack de Nijs)
Little Snowflakes
Lonely Christmas
Lonely Linda
Lonely Me
Lonely Street
Love Letters
Love Lovin' Lover
Love Me Petunia
Love me Tender
Lucille (Jack and Woody-1960)
Marian (Jack de Nijs Sextet)
Malam Kudus (Silent Night)
Maryati
Mary
Mary Jane
Mary Lee (Jack Jersey And The Jordanaires-live recorded)
Mary Lee (Live in Indonesia)
Me And Bobby McGee
Mein Herz ist wieder allein
Melancholy Man
Merry Christmas, Sweet Memory
Mexico (The Losers-1965)
Mexico
Mexico, Mexico, Mexico
Mexican Lady
Mengapa kau Menangis
Mi Bonita
Missing You, That's What I Do
Moon Of The Blues
My Broken Memories
My Father's House
My Love is True
Never Ending Lonely Nights
Never Got No Home
Never Leave me Lonely
Nina Bobo
Nou, nou waar blijf je dan (Jack de Nijs)
No Other Love
No Regrets
Oh daar heb je ze weer (Jack de Nijs)
Ole Sio
On This Night Of A Thousand Stars
One Day At A Time (Jack Jersey and The Jordanaires-live recorded)
Only A Fool
Olé we gaan naar Spanje (Jack de Nijs)
O,O...zit het zo (Jack de Nijs)
Op dat eiland in de zon
Papa Was A Poor Man
Papa Was A Poor Man (Jack Jersey and The Jordanaires-live recorded)
Papa Was A Poor Man - Live In Indonesia
Paulette (Jack and Woody-1960)
Picture On The Wall
Please don't go
Play That Song
Pretend
Pretty Rocking Shoes (The Four Sweeters-1960)
Puerto de Llansa.../Oh Lady Rose
Ramblin' Man
Ready Teddy (live recording)
Rub It In (Jack Jersey And The Jordanaires-live recorded)
Sail Me Across The Water
Santa Claus
Santa Lucia
Send A Little Bit Of Love (Jack Jersey and Lisa MacKaeg)
Sentimental Me 
Shanah
She Was Dynamite
Sheila
She's Not You 
Silent Night
Silvery Moon
Since You've Been Gone
Since You've Gone (The Losers-1965)
Sing Me Back Home
Singaraja (Trincomalee)
Sofia Loren (Jack de Nijs)
Sophia Loren (Jack de Nijs Sextet)
So Sad (Jack and Woody-1960)
Spanish Lady
Sri Lanka... My Shangri-La
63784
Stay 'till Tomorrow (Jack Jersey and The Jordanaires-live recorded)
Stapel op Lou Lou (Jack de Nijs)
Speel mijn lied (Jack de Nijs)
Step Into My Heart
Surrender
Suspicious Minds
Sweet Dreams (My Darlin')
Sweet Ol' Dreams
Tears
The Jerkin'Tree (The Losers-1966)
The reasons why
They Say (Jack and Woody-1960)
The Sun Ain't Gonna Shine Anymore
There Goes My Everything
This Christmas Lore
This Means Goodbye
'Till The End Of Time (Jack Jersey and The Jordanaires-live recorded)
'Till The End Of Time
Tonight Is Allright For Love 
Too Old To Believe
Trincomalee
Una Noche Mexicana
Vaya Con Dios
Viva Mexico
Voodoo Hits Me
Waktu Potong Padi
Was vorbei ist, ist vorbei
Way Down Low
White Christmas
Why Me Lord
Wie wunderbar
Won't you anymore (Jack Dens & The Swallows-1960)
Woman
Yesterday Guy
You treat me wrong
You're Not Gonna See Me Cryin'
You're The One, You're the only
You're The Only Inspiration
You're The Only Reason
Zomerzon (Jack de Nijs Sextet)

Songs for other artists 
The following songs are recorded and released for other artists and or composed and or written and or arranged and or produced by Jack de Nijs.

André Moss 
André Moss is a Dutch saxophonist

Ella (TROS-Tune)
Rosita (TROS-Tune)
Let The Bouzoukis Play
My Spanish Rose
Laura (TROS-Tune)
El Torero
This is My Shangrila
Viva Gerona
Theme For Maria
Melody Of Love
Restless Love
Sweet Maria
Nine Five O
Only Dreams
Rain In Spain
Dressed In Black
Lady Killer
La Puente
Sylvia's Wedding
El Zorro
Sylvia's Dream
Sunday Morning
Roberto
Rose-Valley
Sombras
3000 Miles From Home
Soletario
Carnival in Holland
Dansen is plezier voor twee
La Paloma
Autumn Song
Lady in Blue
A Waste Of Time
El Vida
Mary Ann
Raindrops
Glenn's Party
Fly Me To Bali
Behind The Clouds
Mademoiselle Monique
Para Ti (TROS-Tune)
Fiesta at Night

Jack Jackson 
Alias of guitarist 

Argentina (W.K. 1978 Tune)
Pour Monique (TROS-Tune)
Barbarella
Für Maria (TROS-Tune
Behind The Clouds
Take Your Time
La Comparsa (TROS-Tune)
Driftin'John
The Tears In Your Eyes
Nana's smile
Not For Sale
Valley Of Dreams 
Way Back Home
Hip To The Guitar Man

Nick MacKenzie 

Juanita
One is One
Peaches on a Tree
Der Apfel fällt nicht weit vom Stamm
Please, Let me come on board
In Old Mexico
Hug Me
Tell the World
Got No Home
Answer Me
Te Voljo
Lana
Mona
Oh Woman
You can go your own way
What can I do
Mr. Lonesome
A little bit closer
If you meet her
Lollipop
Sweet little sixteen
Time will show
What kind of man
Fraulein
Holiday Hotel
The Wrong Horse
It's Over
Anita
(Ba-Ba)-Beach Party
Elena
Lembo Tree (remix)
You can light up...
Long Distance Heartbreak
I'm dreamin'
We all get lucky sometimes
Saved by The Grace of Your Love
If you happen to see my woman
Too Old (Too Old to Believe...)
Don't Let It Be Over
Good Times

Frank & Mirella 

Verliefd, Verloofd, Getrouwd
Niemand anders
In onze luchtballon
Morgenvroeg
Stille liefde, stil verdriet
Roberto & Monica
In het diepst van je hart
Manuel (Manuel goodbye)
Santa Domingo's gitaren
Cher Ami
Mexico oh Mexico
Met jou alleen
Stop
Héla, kom met me mee ja
Als het om de liefde gaat
Amore
Op dat plein
Little bit closer
Good Times
Gone With Yesterday
Had ik maar money
Wat ik zou willen
Ga je met me mee?
Santa Lucia
Vergeet de dag van morgen
Ik zie een ster

Maurice de la Croix 
Maurice de la Croix is a Dutch saxophonist

Juliana... Ratu Negeri Blanda (With children's choir)
Fly me to Bali
Kembang Melati
Bengawan Solo
Toradja
Mama's Melody
Broken Clove Melody
Goro Goro Ne
A Heart's Been Broken
Indo Eyes
Tjamahi, Tanah Air Ku
Patah Tjinke

Others 

 Andy Tielman
Say a Simple Word
Manolito
Widouri

André van Duin
 Die Tijd Van Vroeger (Weet Je Nog Die Tijd Van Vroeger

 Zangeres Zonder Naam
 Jongen
 In een Gouden lijstje
 (Kom bij mij...) In Eenzame Nachten
 In Santa Domingo
 In de haven klinkt een lied
 Het moedertje
 Zeg oude muzikant
 Oh Pappie toe drink niet
 Billy Joe
 Zoals vroeger
 Napoli

Rudi Carrell
 Wer kann Heut' noch richtig Flirten (Weet je nog... Die tijd van vroeger)

Gina
Engelchen
Antoinette
Sophia (Sophia Loren)
Angelika

Ray Ventura et son orchestre 
 Les Annees Passent

Ria Valk
Met Iwan op de Divan
Fotomodel
Willem Willem

Conny Vink
Dansen is plezier voor twee
In Petersburg

Tony Bass
Gina Lollobrigida
Elisa

Luc Bral
Hallo, hier ben ik dan
Hé, Hé het is zomer
Hé speelman

Johnny Jordaan
O, Sjaan

Jan Boezeroen
Ze Zeggen...
Oei, Oei
De Fles
Bananenlied
Jouw laatste brief
Midden in de nacht
O Daar heb je ze weer
Meneer de Ooievaar
Lena, waar zit je nou
Nog ééntje dan
Hé, hé...kijk daar eens
Angelica
O wat zie ik
Het whiskey lied
Ik heb niks gezien
Een neutje
Boko Boko
Kleine vent
Alida
O daar komt gedonder van
Het is voorbij
Sjane, Sjane, Sjane
Een zeemansvrouw
Lieve meid
Olleke Bolleke
Als de rimpels in jouw voorhoofd konden praten

Leo den Hop
Oh Antoinette
Morgen een kater
Je bent de sigaar
Jij verandert als het weer
In de Hemel is geen bier
Daar hebben we balen van
Petite Mademoiselle
Zo is het leven

Donna Lynton
(Theme from) Charlie's Angels
If You Need Somebody
Woman With A Smile

Peter Wiedemeyer
(Weet je nog...) Die tijd van vroeger
De straat
De winters waren koud
Eva
In de regen
Zeven dagen

Clover Leaf
Time Will Show
Don't spoil my day
What kind of man
Grey Clouds
Love Really Changed Me
Time Of Troubles
Girl Where Are You Going To
Tell The World
Woman
If you meet her

Road
Never leave me lonely
Time Of Troubles
Sweet Little Sixteen

Moan
Health of freedom

Jack Jackson
Für Maria
Barbarella
The Tears In Your Eyes

Pete & Jackson
Think It Over
Are You Leaving Me

Frank en Nadine (Saxophone players)
 CD Album: Ode aan André Moss
A song for André
Ella
Rosita
Laura
Tears In Your Eyes
Cindy On My Mind
Tell Me Why
Para Tí
Sombras
Let the Bouzouki's play
My Spanish Rose
Dressed in black
Behind the clouds
El Zorro
Fly Me To Bali
A Little Bit Of Love

Ilse de Graaff
For You
I'll Miss You

The Typhoons
Fanny
Blijf bij mij

Peter Vee
Everyday I Want You

Birger Højland
En Tur Til Barcelona
Ud I Det Fri

Cock van der Palm
De “Gouden” Jack de Nijs- medley (a: Boko Boko – b: Boemerang – c: Hou alles in het midden – d: Al zijn m’n centen naar de maan – e: Hé hé kijk daar eens – f: Het is voorbij – g: Boko Boko)
Mira
Addio Amore
De laatste tango
Glaasje op
(We gaan...) Naar Boven
Al gaan m'n centen naar de maan...
Andrea
Donna Maria

Eddy Hense
(nooit vergeet ik meer) Die Nacht

Jan Mol en de Meestampers
Protest
Ik kan het niet laten

De Meestampers
O Heineken bier
Ik kan d'r niks an doen
Tip van Bootz
Nog eentje dan...

Harmen Veerman
Lady Of The Night
Too Old To Believe In You
Picture On The Wall
Mexican Maria

Brabants Bont (Artiestenkoor;Jack de Nijs, Wil de Bras, Leo den Hop, Yvonne de Nijs, Jan Boezeroen)
Protest
Zeg nu Ja voor Veronica

Rossa Nova
Brigitte Bardot
Juanita mi amore

De Mounties

Alida
Het Is Voorbij
Laat de Dokter (nu) maar schuiven (film-tune) (Let the Doctor Shove)
Op het Hoekje brandt nog licht

Yvonne de Nijs
Waar de Wilde Rozen Bloeien
Stop nou eens
Je weet toch wel wat liefde is
Balalaika

Tony Martin
Op een eiland in de zon
Jane
Ciao Carina
Got No Home
Blame It On The Summersun
Ramona
Mary Ann
Sweet Nothings
Sibony
Veronica

Joe Boston Group
All My Sorrow
The World I'm Livin'In

Jan Beton
Van de Ouwerwetse
Annemarie

John Hendrikx
Cry Softly Lonely One
I'm Dreamin' Dreams
I Wouldn't Give You Up
It's Time For Cryin'
Judy
Love Became A Memory

De Dubbeldekkers
Een neutje
Boko Boko
Ughe, Ughe, Ughe
Aloha, mijn bruine Madonna

Sjakie Schram
Zuster, oh zuster

Dennie Christian
Waar gaat de wereld naar toe

Wil de Bras
Die nacht
Hé Hé Rosie
El Zorro
Christina
El Vida
Après toi
Mary Ann
Mona
Sombras
Anna
Het spijt me voor jou
Donna
Waar zijn al mijn dromen
Laat hem toch gaan
Och was ik maar...
Mademoiselle Monique
Nooit op zondag
Meisjes uit Casablanca
Jij hebt hier niks te vertellen
Rumba Banana

De Pedro's
Een laatste kans
Schaduwen (Sombras)

Crown's Clan
No Place For Our Minds

Lisa MacKeag
Send a Little Bit Of Love (duet with Jack Jersey)
Moon Of Matara
Maratap Hati
Bengawan Solo
Selendang Sutra
Lonely Blue Boy
Good Ol' Sunshine
Wake Me Up
It's A Beautiful Day
Geronimo
Hold me
Don't Ever Change Your Mind
For You

Mac Doodle
Drink Lisa drink
Pretty Rose From Amsterdam
Dat gaat altijd zo
De Heilsoldaat

Vincent (Vinzzent)
Gone
Hurry Home
I Can't help Thinking
Sheila

Ferry Ripson
Playboy
Please Don't Go
Kiss Me Once...Kiss Me Twice

Frank & Jenny
Sha La La La Vie
Leven

Frank Michael
Célina (Blue Brown Eyed Lady)
Schiavi D'Amore (I'm Calling)
C'est Fini (Lonely Me)
Tendres Rockers (Don't Break This Heart)

René Schuurmans
Helena
Samen (Woman)
Samen met jou (Puerto de Llansa...Oh Lady Rose)/Since you've been gone

Frans Bauer & Marianne Weber
Wat ik zou willen

Vader Abraham
Ik leef om te leven
Vlaanderen

The Shorts
Comment ça va
One pair
Een beetje vuur
Ik zing
Springtime
I'm a musician
Je suis, tu es
Subway Love
I'm saving
Annabelle
Goodbye, don't cry

Roy Ascott
So Everybody Dance
I Can't Help Thinking
If There is Sunshine
When My Little Girl Is Smiling

Milly en de Mooks
Waarom liet ik jou alleen
Ik zie je nu met andere ogen

Tumult
Marleen
Zaterdagavond

Oscar Benton
You and I
Let Me Be Your Day
Can I Reach You
So Everybody Dance...(and drink all night...)
Spanish Lady
Never Never Leave Me
Baby Help Me

Herbert Verhaeghe
Godenkind (Silvery Moon)
Koud en eenzaam (Lonely Christmas)

Frank Evans  (Frank Ashton)
Reno Town (the winning song of the Soundmixshow in 1986)
Sheila
Hallo Aline
Hello Darling

Arne Jansen & Les Cigales
Mooie meisjes
Jenny
Ladykiller
Judy
Ik heb de hele nacht
Ik ken veel meisjes
Zo zijn de meisjes

Henk Damen
Jongen (Duet met Zangeres Zonder Naam)

De Tunes
Doe toch niet zo stoer man (Papa Was A Poor Man)

Gérard Croce
Des Femmes et Du Bon Vin

Peter Koolen
Juanita

Robby
Judy
Ginny weet je niet

References 

Jersey, Jack